Daniel Andreas San Diego (born February 9, 1978) is an American domestic terrorism suspect who is listed on the FBI Most Wanted Terrorists list. He is a straight edge vegan environmentalist and animal liberationist believed to have ties to an Animal Liberation Brigade cell responsible for two bombings in 2003. Andreas is also believed to have ties to Stop Huntingdon Animal Cruelty.



Background
San Diego was born in 1978 in Berkeley, California and grew up in San Rafael, California. He attended Terra Linda High School. He took classes at College of Marin and worked at San Rafael High School's radio station, KSRH, listening to heavy metal and rock music. As a young man he gave up drugs, alcohol, meat, and milk products, taking an interest in the straight edge movement and becoming vegan.

At the time of the bombings he lived in Schellville, California, a small community outside of Sonoma, where he worked as a computer specialist. His landlord described him as "very nice and personable," mentioned his claim to be starting a new business venture of vegan marshmallows made without gelatin, and said that he had never given the impression of holding radical views on animal rights. The FBI claims this was all an act.

San Diego is described as having ties to Stop Huntingdon Animal Cruelty (SHAC) as a well-known San Francisco Bay Area animal rights activist. SHAC is an international campaign set up to close down Europe's largest animal testing laboratory, Huntingdon Life Sciences, a company that performs drug and chemical research experiments on animals. Before the related bombings SHAC targeted HLS customer Chiron and its employees with a series of actions, accusing them of being "puppy killers."

Animal Liberation Brigade
On August 28, 2003, two sophisticated homemade bombs exploded approximately one hour apart, at the Chiron Corporation in Emeryville, California, causing minor property damage but no injuries. The FBI believes the second bomb was timed to target first responders. Another bomb, wrapped with nails to produce shrapnel, exploded on September 26, 2003 at the Shaklee Corporation in Pleasanton, California, again causing damage but no casualties. The bombs used ammonium nitrate explosives and mechanical timers.

A group called the Revolutionary Cells – Animal Liberation Brigade claimed responsibility via an email message after each bombing. FBI agents admit that they cannot prove San Diego has ties to the emails, but believe he has ties to the group that sent them. The FBI stated San Diego is suspected of having carried out the bombing. The bombing targets were chosen because they were both clients of Huntingdon Life Sciences.

Disappearance
The FBI had San Diego under 24-hour surveillance in 2003. He discovered that he was being watched and on October 6, 2003 parked his car in downtown San Francisco, California, walked away, and never returned.

Most Wanted
Daniel Andreas San Diego was indicted in 2004. He became the first domestic terrorism suspect to be added to the FBI Most Wanted Terrorists List, and first animal rights activist. In 2014, as part of the FBI's National Digital Billboard Initiative, San Diego was to be featured on electronic billboards throughout California, Massachusetts, Oregon, Nevada, and Florida, and along the US-Canada border in New York and Washington State. At one point, the FBI believed he was in the Northampton, Massachusetts area. In early 2014, the FBI announced that they had "credible intelligence" that San Diego might be on Hawaii's Big Island.

San Diego was profiled on America's Most Wanted five times after his disappearance. 

, a reward of up to $250,000 USD was available for information that leads to the arrest of San Diego.

See also
List of fugitives from justice who disappeared

References

External links
Daniel Andreas San Diego - FBI's Most Wanted Terrorists
Daniel Andreas San Diego - America's Most Wanted

1978 births
Activists from the San Francisco Bay Area
American animal rights activists
Eco-terrorism
FBI Most Wanted Terrorists
Fugitives wanted by the United States
Fugitives wanted on terrorism charges
Living people
People from Berkeley, California
People from San Rafael, California